Decodes is a genus of moths in the family Tortricidae.

Species
Decodes aneuretus Powell, in Obraztsov & Powell, 1961
Decodes asapheus Powell, 1980
Decodes australus Powell, 1965
Decodes basiplagana (Walsingham, 1879)
Decodes bicolor Powell, in Obraztsov & Powell, 1961
Decodes catherinae Powell, 1980
Decodes fragariana (Busck, 1919)
Decodes helix Powell & Brown, 1998
Decodes horariana (Walsingham, 1879)
Decodes johnstoni Powell, in Obraztsov & Powell, 1961
Decodes lundgreni Powell, 1980
Decodes macdunnoughi Powell, 1980
Decodes macswaini Powell, 1980
Decodes montanus Powell, in Obraztsov & Powell, 1961
Decodes opleri Powell, 1980
Decodes placita (Walsingham, 1914)
Decodes stevensi Powell, 1980
Decodes tahoense Powell, 1980
Decodes tonto Powell, 1980
Decodes zimapanus Powell, 1980

See also
List of Tortricidae genera

References

External links
tortricidae.com

Cnephasiini
Tortricidae genera